Saeed Suleiman (born 18 April 1999) is an Emirati professional footballer who plays as a defender for Ajman on loan from Shabab Al-Ahli.

References

External links 
 

1999 births
Living people
Emirati footballers
Association football defenders
Shabab Al-Ahli Club players
Hatta Club players
Ajman Club players
UAE Pro League players